The Cherry County Courthouse, at 4th and Main Sts. in Valentine, Nebraska, is a Romanesque-style historic building that was built in 1901.  It is listed on the National Register of Historic Places.  In its NRHP nomination, the courthouse was deemed "historically significant for its association with politics and local government", and serving as a good example of a county government building in Nebraska.

It was listed on the National Register of Historic Places in 1990.  The listing included two contributing objects in addition to the courthouse building, a contributing building.

References

External links 
More photos of the Cherry County Courthouse at Wikimedia Commons

Romanesque Revival architecture in Nebraska
Buildings and structures in Cherry County, Nebraska
County courthouses in Nebraska
Courthouses on the National Register of Historic Places in Nebraska
Historic districts on the National Register of Historic Places in Nebraska
National Register of Historic Places in Cherry County, Nebraska